In heraldry, a label (occasionally lambel, the French form of the word) is a charge resembling the strap crossing the horse's chest from which pendants are hung. It is usually a mark of difference, but has sometimes been borne simply as a charge in its own right.

The pendants were originally drawn in a rectangular shape, but in later years have often been drawn as dovetails. The label is almost always placed in the chief. In most cases the horizontal band extends right across the shield, but there are several examples in which the band is truncated.

As a mark of difference 

In European heraldry in general, the label was used to mark the elder son, generally by the princes of the royal house. Differencing, or cadency, are the distinctions used to indicate the junior branches (cadets) of a family.

In British heraldry, a system of specific brisures or "marks of cadency" developed: The eldest son, during the lifetime of his father, bears the family arms with the addition of a label; the second son a crescent, the third, a mullet, the fourth, a martlet, the fifth, an annulet; the sixth, a fleur-de-lis; the seventh, a rose; the eighth, a cross moline; the ninth, a double quatrefoil. On the death of his father, the eldest son would remove the label from his coat of arms and assume the unmodified arms.

The label's number of points did not necessarily mean anything, although the label of three points was supposed to represent the heir during the lifetime of his father; five points, during the lifetime of his grandfather; seven points, while the great-grandfather still lived, etc. 

According to some sources, the elder son of an elder son places a label upon a label. However, A. C. Fox-Davies states that in the case of the heir-apparent of the heir-apparent "one label of five points is used, and to place a label upon a label is not correct when both are marks of cadency, and not charges".

As a charge 
The label appears as a charge in the coats of arms of several families and municipalities, often having begun as a mark of difference and been perpetuated.  It has also been used in canting arms.
The number of pendants varies from three to seven (see examples below). There are also several examples of the pendants bearing charges, especially in the coats of arms of the British Royal Family (see examples below).

References
 A. C. Fox-Davies, revised by J. P. Brooke-Little, Richmond Herald (1969). A Complete Guide to Heraldry. London: Thomas Nelson and Sons.

Heraldic charges

ru:Знаки младших линий рода